শ্রেষ্ঠ (Greatness) is the second album by Bangladeshi metal band Cryptic Fate released in 2002 by G-Series. It is the band's first Bengali album. It is also their first album to feature guitarist Farhan Samad.

Production problems 
Cryptic Fate began writing their second album in 1996 and in the summer of 1997 began recording at Soundgarden Studios under the title Srestho. Upon completion the band spent the rest of the year looking for a production company to release the album. After failing to find one the album, copies of Sreshtho were leaked to fans, and quickly garner lavish praise from underground listeners.

By 1998 Wahed had left the band and Farhan was brought in to replace the guitarist. Cryptic Fate went on to perform live shows with various underground artists of the country throughout 1998-2001 but with different drummers filling in for them.
Cryptic Fate receives sponsorship from Pepsi in 2001 soon after that Sarfaraz temporarily leaves the band due to personal reasons. The band performs a concert at the Army Stadium where they introduce new drummer, Turjo.
Close to year-end, Fate contributed a song to the mixed album Charpatra. Shakib and Farhan collaborate for the first time, and the result is “Cholo Bangladesh” – a cricket anthem that goes on to become Fate’s first mainstream hit.

Charpatra lineup:
 Bass/Vocals – Shakib
 Guitars – Farhan
 Drums – Turjo

Buoyed by the success of Charpatra, another mixed album Anushilon is released, and Fate was invited to contribute two songs. The band once again finds itself without a drummer (Turjo was busy with studies). Left with no choice, Farhan and Shakib play drums on “Shokal Choita” and “Eito Cholchey”, respectively. On a more positive note, Sarfaraz returns to the band, composing “Eito Cholchey”. A full four years after it was recorded, Sreshtho finally sees light of day, with band’s new label G-Series. The album is an instant hit.

Track listing

Personnel 

 Shakib Chowdhury — lead vocals, bass
 Khwaja Sarfaraz Latifullah — lead guitars
 Farhan Samad — rhythm guitars
 Farshed Mahmud — drums

External links
 https://web.archive.org/web/20110715101739/http://community.polapain.com/cryptic-fate-t7695.html

Cryptic Fate albums
2002 albums